The Réunion national rugby union team represents Réunion in the sport of rugby union. As an overseas department of France, Réunion can participate in international competition, but not for the Rugby World Cup. Réunion has thus far competed in the south section of the CAR Development Trophy along with African nations.



Record

Overall

See also
 French Rugby Federation
 Comité Territorial de Rugby de la Réunion
 Rugby union in Réunion

External links
 Comité de Rugby de la Réunion on aslagnyrugby.net

References

Rugby union in Réunion
R
African national rugby union teams